Bohlulabad (also Romanized as Bohlūlābād, Bahlūlābād, and Bohlool Abad; also known as Tāzehkand) is a village in Zangebar Rural District of the Central District of Poldasht County, West Azerbaijan province, Iran. At the 2006 National Census, its population was 1,383 in 304 households, when it was in the former Poldasht District of Maku County. The following census in 2011 counted 1,417 people in 385 households, by which time the district had been separated from the county, Poldasht County established, and divided into two districts: the Central and Aras Districts. The latest census in 2016 showed a population of 1,326 people in 419 households; it was the largest village in its rural district.

References 

Poldasht County

Populated places in West Azerbaijan Province

Populated places in Poldasht County